Aäron Lelie (25 April 1886 – 25 March 1954) was a Dutch wrestler. He competed in the men's Greco-Roman middleweight at the 1908 Summer Olympics.

References

1886 births
1954 deaths
Dutch male sport wrestlers
Olympic wrestlers of the Netherlands
Wrestlers at the 1908 Summer Olympics
Sportspeople from Amsterdam